Sebt Gzoula is a town in Safi Province, Marrakesh-Safi, Morocco. According to the 2004 census it has a population of 13,943.

References

Populated places in Safi Province
Municipalities of Morocco